Rail transport in Sweden uses a network of 15,006.25 km of track, the 23nd largest in the world. Construction of the first railway line in Sweden began in 1855. The major operator of passenger trains has traditionally been the state-owned SJ AB, though today around 70% of all rail traffic consists of subsidised local and regional trains for which the regional public transport authorities bear responsibility. Passenger traffic has increased significantly since the turn of the millennium, and in 2019 Sweden ranked number five in the world (as measured in passenger kilometres per capita) and number three in the European union, as well as number sixth in the world when measured by passenger share (third in the E.U.).
 
In 1988, prompted by SJ's large deficits, the Swedish parliament privatized the network by ordering that the ownership of rail infrastructure be separated from the ownership of train operations, and opened up the system to private sector train operators by introducing competitive tendering for local rail service contracts.

Unlike the roads, railways in Sweden use left-handed traffic for trains (the same as the metro) because Sweden drove on the left until 1967. Railways did not switch because the engines of the time had the driver's seat on the left side; the signals are normally located to the left and hence are easier to see. Only railways in Malmö and further south have planned right-hand traffic due to their connection with Denmark. However, as signals are placed in both directions on all tracks, it is possible to drive both left- and right-sided at the traffic controller's discretion.

Sweden is a member of the International Union of Railways (UIC). The UIC Country Code for Sweden is 74.

Operators

Passenger traffic on Swedish railways consists of commercial long-distance lines as well as regional and local trains, which are always subsidised by the regional public transport authorities. As measured by train kilometres, the commercial lines correspond to 28% of the traffic (in 2016); the rest being subsidised local and regional rail traffic.

The major national commercial passenger train operator is SJ AB (usually just called SJ), fully owned by the state, which has a rather comprehensive network of commercially operated routes between the major cities with few, if any, stops in smaller towns. Between the major cities in southern Sweden, SJ operates the high-speed train X2000 (200 kph) on an hourly basis. MTRX operates high-speed trains (200 kph) between Stockholm and Gothenburg, around every second hour. FlixTrain operates the same route with around three trains a day. Snälltåget operates the route Stockholm-Malmö-Copenhagen (Høje Taastrup)-Hamburg-Berlin. Tågab operates services Gothenburg-Skövde-Karlstad, Gothenburg-Trollhättan-Karlstad-Stockholm, Gothenburg-Falun and Karlstad-Alvesta. Fares in the commercial traffic can be complex and usually vary depending on demand.

The subsidised traffic covering most Swedish railway routes are handled and marketed by the different regional transport authorities, such as Skånetrafiken, Västtrafik and Storstockholms lokaltrafik.  Usually, tickets to these trains are sold by the regional public transport authority also holding full responsibility for the trains despite contracting SJ or a private operator, sometimes from another country, to actually run the trains. Many regional train systems, such as Øresundståg, Krösatågen, Västtågen, Norrtåg and Mälartåg are joint ventures where different regional public authorities are involved.  Tram systems are used in Gothenburg, Norrköping, Stockholm and, since 2020, Lund. There is a metro system in Stockholm, the Stockholm Metro.

While most current railway lines of Sweden were determined and built by the state, and receive their technical upkeep from the public as well, SJ no longer holds a monopoly on operating and owning passenger trains where such can be run profitably on a commercial basis. Large parts of the rail network serve parts of the country which don't generate enough passenger or cargo traffic to make a profit, and on some of these stretches SJ has held a de facto monopoly until recently (2010, see below in this section). Average speed is an important factor regarding profitability (more distance per hour means more income per hour). All subsidised and commercial traffic is operated on state-owned tracks, except Inlandsbanan, Roslagsbanan and Saltsjöbanan which are locally or regionally owned and Arlandabanan which is owned by private interests.

A decision was made in March 2009 to cancel the monopoly for SJ. By autumn 2009, free competition was allowed on Saturdays and Sundays when there is more room on the tracks, and competition was allowed to a full extent by autumn of 2010. In 2019, the Swedish railways were called 'the most deregulated railways in the world'.

Rail traffic is supervised by the Swedish Transport Administration, a government agency.

History 

The first Swedish railroad for public transport using horse-drawn carriages, the Frykstads railroad in Värmland was opened in 1849.

In 1853 the Riksdag of the Estates decided that the State would build main line railways, but that other lines would be built by private enterprises (often with cities as main owners), and in 1856 the first stretch, between Örebro and Nora (a private railroad), was opened for traffic.

The main line railways were of major importance for the development of the Swedish industry. The first two main line railways were the Southern, stretching from Stockholm to Malmö in the south, and the Western, to Gothenburg in the west. These line railways were finished between 1860 and 1864. The Northern railway runs parallel to the Baltic coast (but not along it) up to Boden in northern Sweden, and was finished in 1894. The Inland Railway runs from Gällivare in the north to Kristinehamn in the center of the country, through the central parts of northern Sweden, and was built between 1908 and 1937. It was a part of the 1853 decision that the railways should avoid coasts, and not make detours to pass medium size cities along the route. The reason for avoiding coasts (most evident for the railway to northern Sweden) was to protect it from military attacks, and because steam boats were already established along the coasts as a much faster transport method than before. Railways built by private companies, e.g. Västkustbanan (1888), were however sometimes built very close to the coast.

The construction of the early main lines provided a fast and safe connection from the mines in the north to the rest of Sweden. It also facilitated business (and private) travel, which had earlier required horse-drawn carriages. Roslagsbanan is the oldest electrified railway line for personnel transportation in northern Europe. Malmbanan, the railway line between Luleå, Sweden, and Narvik, Norway was inaugurated on July 14, 1903. The stretch between Kiruna and Riksgränsen was the first major railway line in Sweden to be electrified in 1915.

Network

Total: 15006.25 km (includes 3,600 km of privately owned railways)
Standard gauge: 15006.25 km of  gauge (8100 km electrified and 4925.75 km double track (2008)
(2019).

Lines

Main lines 

There used to be six main lines, all nationally owned:

Västra stambanan (Western main line), 453 km, Stockholm-Gothenburg through Katrineholm-Hallsberg-Laxå-Falköping
Södra stambanan (Southern main line), 381 km, Malmö-Falköping through Nässjö-Jönköping
Östra stambanan (Eastern main line), 216 km, Nässjö-Katrineholm through Mjölby-Linköping-Norrköping)
Norra stambanan (Northern main line), 484 km, Stockholm-Ånge through Uppsala-Avesta Krylbo
Stambanan genom övre Norrland (Main line through upper Norrland), 629 km, Bräcke-Boden through Långsele-Vännäs
Nordvästra stambanan (Northwestern main line), 209 km, Laxå-Norwegian border through Karlstad-Kil-Charlottenberg
Some lines were upgraded to main lines but have since been downgraded:
Mittbanan (Norrland cross line), about 500 km, Sundsvall-Norwegian border through Ånge-Östersund
Inlandsbanan, about 1300 km, Kristinehamn-Gällivare through Mora-Östersund

The naming rationale was that lines built by the state were main lines, but others, such as by private companies, were not. Mainly 1940–1952, most lines were purchased by the state, making the term main line less well-defined.

Today, changes have been made in the terminology reducing the number of main lines to four. The northwestern main line is not considered a main line anymore and has been renamed . The southern main line between Nässjö and Falköping has also been downgraded since what was once part of the Eastern main line (Nässjö - Katrineholm) is now considered a part of the southern one. The Norrland cross line is not a main line anymore, but a regional railway. The northern main line south of Ockelbo refers to a shorter way than the line through Avesta. The Ostkustbanan Stockholm-Sundsvall is now considered a main line, since it has the majority of the passenger traffic into Norrland. The  was considered a main line for a few decades, but is now a tourist railway only. The main lines are still owned by the state, except , which is owned by the counties it runs through.

Other lines

Ådalsbanan
Älmhult-Olofström railway
Älvsborgsbanan
Bastuträsk-Skelleftehamn railway
Bergslagsbanan
Bergslagspendeln
Blekinge kustbana
Bofors-Strömtorp railway
Bohusbanan
Bollnäs-Furudal
Botniabanan
Dalabanan
Forsmo-Hoting railway
Fryksdalsbanan
Godsstråket genom Bergslagen
Godsstråket genom Skåne
Göteborgs hamnbana
Halmstad-Nässjö railway
Haparandabanan
Jönköpingsbanan

Kinnekullebanan
Kontinentalbanan
Kristinehamn-Persberg railway
Kust till kust-banan
Lilla Edet-Alvhem railway
Lysekilsbanan
Malmbanan
Markarydsbanan
Mellansel-Örnsköldsvik railway
Mora-Märbäck railway
Morjärv-Karlborgsbruk railway
Mälarbanan
Nässjö-Åseda railway
Nässjö-Oskarshamn railway
Norbergsbanan
Norge-/Vänerbanan
Nynäsbanan
Örbyhus-Hallstavik railway
Öresundsbanan

Österlenbanan
Ostkustbanan
Piteåbanan
Roslagsbanan
Rååbanan
Sala-Oxelösund railway
Skånebanan
Storuman-Hällnäs railway
Stångådalsbanan
Svealandsbanan
Söderhamn-Kilafors railway
Södra stambanan
Tjustbanan
Viskadalsbanan
Vännäs-Holmsund railway
Västerdalsbanan
Västkustbanan
Ystadbanan

Railway links with adjacent countries 
 Denmark: same gauge, voltage change 15 kV AC / 25 kV AC - Øresund Bridge and train ferry Göteborg - Frederikshavn.
 Finland: break-of-gauge / (short dual gauge track between the two stations closest to the border, without overhead lines. Train ferry Stockholm - Turku (Finland).
 Germany: train ferry, same gauge, no electric propulsion on board. Train ferry Malmö - Travemünde, Trelleborg - Sassnitz (Mukran) and Trelleborg - Rostock.
 Norway: same gauge, same voltage (three electric lines and one non-electric)
 Poland: same gauge, train ferry Ystad - Świnoujście, no electric propulsion on board.

Sweden and Norway have the same ATC system and the same voltage, meaning that trains can generally cross the border without being specially modified. Sweden and Denmark have different ATC systems and different voltage, so only specially modified trains can cross the border. The X31K Öresund trains and some of the SJ X2 (branded X2000) trains can do that.

Train ferries never have electric overhead lines on board, so diesel must be used to get trains onboard/offboard. Generally locomotives are not transported on these ferries, only train cars.

International passenger trains today (2016) operate on rather few lines:

 Norway
 From Oslo to Gothenburg and to Stockholm
 From Narvik to Stockholm via Kiruna
 From Trondheim to Storlien
 Denmark
 From Copenhagen via Øresund bridge to Malmö, to Stockholm, to Gothenburg and to Ystad
 Germany
 From Berlin and Hamburg via Denmark to Malmö

No passenger trains operate between Finland and Sweden, neither through Haparanda/Tornio nor train ferry to Turku.

See also
 Rail transport by country
 High-speed rail in Sweden
 Transportation in Sweden
 Rail transport in Europe

References

External links

Swedish Transport Administration
Official site of Swedish Railways, Statens järnvägars
Search engine for all public transport inside Sweden
 illustrated description of the Swedish system in the 1930s